The Dr Lee's Professorships are three named statutory professorships of the University of Oxford. They were created in 1919, and are named after Matthew Lee (1695–1755) who had endowed three readerships at Christ Church, Oxford, in the 19th century.

Dr Lee's Professor of Anatomy

This professorship is linked with a fellowship at Hertford College, Oxford.

 Arthur Thomson (1919 to ?); first incumbent 
 Sir Wilfrid Le Gros Clark (1934 to 1962)
 Ray Guillery (1984 to 1996)
 Dame Kay Davies (1998 to present)

Dr Lee's Professor of Chemistry

This professorship is linked with a fellowship at Exeter College, Oxford.

 Frederick Soddy (1919 to 1936); first incumbent
 Sir Cyril Hinshelwood (1937 to ?)
 Sir Rex Richards (1964 to 1969)
 Frederick Dainton, Baron Dainton (1970 to 1973)
 Sir John Shipley Rowlinson (1974 to 1993)
 Jacob Klein (2000 to 2008)
 Dame Carol Robinson (2009 to present); first female chemistry professor at Oxford

Dr Lee's Professor of Experimental Philosophy (Physics)

This professorship is linked with a fellowship at Wadham College, Oxford.

 Frederick Lindemann, 1st Viscount Cherwell (1919 to ?); first incumbent
 Sir Francis Simon (1956); died one month after taking up the professorship 
 Brebis Bleaney (1957 to 1977)
 Sir William Mitchell (1978 to ?)
 Roger Cowley (1988 to 2007)
 Paolo Radaelli (2008 to present)

References

Professorships at the University of Oxford